Nouraei is an Arabic surname. Notable people with the surname include:

Bahram Nouraei (born 1988), Iranian hip hop artist and producer
Nasser Nouraei (born 1954), Iranian football player 

Arabic-language surnames